Filip Žderić (born 11 December 1991) is a Croatian professional footballer who plays as a right back for Rudeš.

Club career

Kukësi
In January 2018, Žderić moved to Albanian Superliga club Kukësi on a free transfer. He made his league debut for the club on 26 January 2018 in a 3-1 away victory over KF Vllaznia Shkodër. In this match, he also scored his first league goal for Kukësi. The goal, scored in the 80th minute, made the score 2-1. He played all ninety minutes of the match. He left the club at the end of the season.

NK Zadar
On 21 March 2019 it was confirmed, that Žderić had joined Croatian Second Football League club NK Zadar.

Honours
HNK Cibalia
Croatian Second Football League: 2015–16

References

External links
 
 
 

1991 births
Living people
Footballers from Karlsruhe
Association football fullbacks
Croatian footballers
NK GOŠK Gabela players
FC Šiauliai players
NK Imotski players
HNK Cibalia players
CS Gaz Metan Mediaș players
FK Kukësi players
NK Zadar players
FC Botev Vratsa players
NK Kustošija players
NK Rudeš players
Premier League of Bosnia and Herzegovina players
A Lyga players
First Football League (Croatia) players
Croatian Football League players
Liga I players
Kategoria Superiore players
First Professional Football League (Bulgaria) players
Croatian expatriate footballers
Expatriate footballers in Bosnia and Herzegovina
Croatian expatriate sportspeople in Bosnia and Herzegovina
Expatriate footballers in Lithuania
Croatian expatriate sportspeople in Lithuania
Expatriate footballers in Romania
Croatian expatriate sportspeople in Romania
Expatriate footballers in Albania
Croatian expatriate sportspeople in Albania
Expatriate footballers in Bulgaria
Croatian expatriate sportspeople in Bulgaria